"Saft" is a word for juice or diluting juice in Germanic languages.

Saft may refer to:

Jamie Saft, American jazz musician
Saft (band), band led by the Norwegian guitarist Trygve Thue 
Saft Groupe S.A., French battery company
"Saft (song)", song by Die Fantastischen Vier 
SAF-T, Standard Audit File for Tax
Statistical associating fluid theory (SAFT)

German-language surnames
Jewish surnames